Diana Antwi Hamilton is a Ghanaian gospel musician with several awards to her name. She won the 2021 Most Streamed Female Act of the Year Award at the 3Music Women's Brunch. In March 2021, she was among the Top 30 Most Influential Women in Music by the 3Music Awards Women's Brunch. She was crowned Artist of the Year and Gospel Artist of the Year at the 2021 Ghana Music Awards on June 26 with her song "Adom".

Early life and education 
Diana was born on 4 December 1978. She had her basic education at Morning Star School, Cantonments in Accra. She continued her secondary education at the Ghana National College, Cape Coast and proceeded to study and practice nursing at Komfo Anokye Nursing College.

Career 
At an early age of 13, Diana was a backing vocalist for Francis Agyei. She released her debut album in 2007 titled, "Ɔsoro bɛkasa" and this album enjoyed some good airplay which brought her into the limelight. Her second album "Ensi wo yie", released in 2010, gained her prominence in the Ghanaian Gospel Music Industry. She was one of the headline artistes for the 2019 Harvest Praise which happened at the Fantasy Dome in Accra. 1615 media  manages her music career.  In May 2021, she was unveiled together with Kofi Kinaata as the Brand Ambassadors of Enterprise Life. She opened the second day of the 2021 VGMA music awards night with her performance.

Personal life 
Diana  is married to Dr. Joseph Hamilton and the couple have a set of twins (Michaela and Michael). She delights in cooking and designing her clothes. She enjoys hanging out with her siblings; Eunice, Victoria, Samuel, Adelaide, Beatrice, Paa Kwesi and Grace. Diana Antwi Hamilton is also known for her charitable endeavours. On Saturday, February 4, 2017, she launched the Diana Hamilton Foundation, a charitable organization to help provide for the needs of the underprivileged in society.

Discography

Albums

Awards

External links 
 Diana Antwi Hamilton on Facebook

References 

Ghanaian gospel singers
People from Kumasi
Living people
21st-century Ghanaian singers
Ghanaian nurses
Ghana National College alumni
Year of birth missing (living people)
1978 births